Guvåg is a village in Bø Municipality in Nordland county, Norway.  The village is located on the shore of Eidsfjord between the mouth of Jørnfjorden to the east and Hellfjorden to the west. Many skerries lie in the sea near Guvåg. Ørntuva Hill rises immediately north of Guvåg, with the Breitinden Plateau rising beyond that.

Norwegian County Road 913, which terminates in Guvåg, runs north from the village, connecting it to other settlements on the island of Langøya.

References

Bø, Nordland
Villages in Nordland